Joshua Michael Thomas (born 26 May 1987) is an Australian comedian, actor and writer. In 2005, he won the Melbourne International Comedy Festival's Raw Comedy Competition. He has since appeared on television numerous times, including as a regular and Generation Y team captain on Network Ten's Talkin' 'Bout Your Generation. In 2013, Thomas created the award-winning ABC2 and Pivot television series Please Like Me, which he also co-wrote and starred in.

Early life
Thomas was born in Blackwater, Queensland, the son of Rebecca and Mike Thomas. He lived in Chapel Hill and Westlake in Brisbane's western suburbs and attended Kenmore State High School, from which he matriculated in 2004. He studied for a Bachelor of Creative Industries, majoring in Television at the Queensland University of Technology, but dropped out after one year.

Career
In 2005 he won the Melbourne International Comedy Festival's RAW Comedy Award. He made the finals of So You Think You're Funny at the Edinburgh Festival Fringe. The following year, he was selected to perform in The Comedy Zone, a showcase of Australia's most promising up-and-coming comedians presented by the Melbourne International Comedy Festival.

In 2007, Thomas' first solo show, "Please Like Me" debuted at the Melbourne International Comedy Festival, where it received the Melbourne Airport Award for Best Newcomer.  His live shows have toured both nationally and internationally, appearing in both Edinburgh and Montreal's comedy festivals. In 2010, Thomas toured his coming-out themed stand-up show "Surprise", taking it to the Adelaide Fringe, Brisbane Comedy Festival and Melbourne International Comedy Festival.

2011 saw him touring Everything Ever at the Melbourne Comedy Festival, among other locations.

Podcast
Thomas has a podcast called Josh Thomas and Friend, available from iTunes, which features Thomas and his comedian friends Mel Buttle and Tom Ward. In November 2009 a second series of the podcast was released on iTunes, and the first series was deleted. The third series was released in 2011, and the second series was deleted as well.

Television
In 2009, Thomas became a regular and Generation Y team captain on Network Ten's Talkin' 'Bout Your Generation. He also competed in Celebrity MasterChef Australia, but lost in the first heat to Kirk Pengilly of INXS.

Please Like Me 
In February 2013, the television series Please Like Me, written by Thomas, debuted on ABC2. Participant Media's television network Pivot acquired the series for the US and premiered all six episodes as a binge marathon on 1 August 2013 to celebrate the channel's launch after premiering the first episode online.  The initial six-part series is based on his stand-up comedy shows and stars Thomas as himself.

In 2014, the series was nominated for an International Emmy Award for Best Comedy Series. For his work on the series, Thomas has won various accolades, including an AACTA Award for Best Television Screenplay in 2015. In 2015 it was short-listed for the Betty Roland Prize for Scriptwriting, New South Wales Premier's Literary Awards.

Everything's Gonna Be Okay 
In 2018, Thomas created Everything's Gonna Be Okay, a television comedy about a single man (played by himself) in his twenties who stays in the United States, after his father dies, to take care of his teenage half-sisters. The show was given a pilot order by Freeform, and was picked up to series. The show premiered in January 2020, with Thomas starring, writing, and serving as the showrunner in the series.

Personal life
He is openly gay.
Thomas was diagnosed with attention deficit hyperactivity disorder (ADHD) at the age of 28. In 2021, he revealed that he is also autistic.

Awards and nominations

ARIA Music Awards
The ARIA Music Awards are a set of annual ceremonies presented by Australian Recording Industry Association (ARIA), which recognise excellence, innovation, and achievement across all genres of the music of Australia. They commenced in 1987.

! 
|-
| 2011 || Josh Thomas Surprise Warehouse Comedy Festival || ARIA Award for Best Comedy Release ||  || 
|-

References

External links

1987 births
Living people
Australian male comedians
Australian podcasters
Australian male television actors
Gay comedians
Australian television writers
Australian gay writers
Australian gay actors
Australian male television writers
People on the autism spectrum
Australian LGBT comedians
Australian LGBT screenwriters